Hithadhoo (Dhivehi: ހިތަދޫ) is a district of Addu City, in the Maldives. Hithadhoo is the main administrative district of Addu City, with many of the administrative buildings in this district. The town is situated on the island of the same name, the westernmost of Addu Atoll (previously known as Seenu Atoll). In terms of population count, Hithadhoo is home to the largest population in Addu City. According to the 2014 Census, with 11,129 residents, Hithadhoo also has the largest population of any administrative island in Maldives, a category that excludes the much larger national capital, Malé.

Geography

The part of the island south of the town is lushly vegetated with palms and shrubs, whilst the northern end of the island consists of a partially stony, unreal scrubland, which can be explored only on narrow trails. Hithadhoo Town is marked by dusty roads, narrow lanes, leaning houses and dense vegetation. Island traffic is generally quite colourful, particularly when hundreds of island school children dressed in a multitude of differently coloured school uniforms are queueing up for the bus.

Population
According to the 2014 census, Hithadhoo has a population of some 11,129 residents, and is the second largest settlement in Maldives. The local dialect of Dhivehi, Addu Bas, is spoken by most of the people who live here. Addu Bas is closely related to dialects spoken on nearby atolls. It is also the second most spoken dialect in the whole Maldives.

Economy
Youth (15–20) Unemployment Rate is at a high 46% (37% Male: 54% Female) and Proportion of population having telephone is 96%.

Services

Education

Hithadhoo has a number of educational institutions; 3 kindergartens (nursery schools), three primary and three secondary schools as well as a college. Most Hithadhoo residents complete their education up to Ordinary Level on the island itself, whilst a few options to continue their studies in Malé or abroad. A certain number of youngsters from neighbouring islands, mainly from Maradhoo, Maradhoo-Feydhoo, and Feydhoo attend sharafuddin School, a secondary school on Hithadhoo, to complete their O-level studies. Several students from other atolls like Fuvahmulah attend secondary schools on Hithadhoo in order to have a better education than can be had on their home islands.

Healthcare
The government has provided the residents with a hospital. This hospital has a regional function and provides around-the-clock care. Most residents of neighbouring islands visit Hithadhoo Regional Hospital to receive treatment for their ailments. People from atolls and islands further afield, such as Fuvammulah and Huvadhu Atoll also occasionally visit to receive medical treatment, although most opt for hospitals in the Southern Indian state of Kerala which provides a much wider range of facilities than available in Maldives.
Apart from this, there are some private clinics like Eye Care Clinic. Eye Care is a reputed private organization in Maldives for its quality service with qualified Ophthalmologists and Optometrists and branded items. It is the largest eye-care provider in Maldives with its six outlets in different parts of the country including the one in S. Hithadhoo.

See also
 Hithadhoo (Laamu Atoll)
 Abdullah Afeef

References

External links
 Addu tourist board site
 Addu Atoll Pictures

Populated places in the Maldives
Addu Atoll